Frankie Starlight is a 1995 drama–romantic war film directed by Michael Lindsay-Hogg. The screenplay was written by Ronan O'Leary and Chet Raymo, based on the internationally best-selling novel The Dork of Cork by Raymo.

Plot
Frank Bois writes a successful first novel and finds himself looking back over his life. His mother Bernadette (Parillaud) was a French woman who, after the death of her friends and family in World War II, hid herself aboard an Allied war ship heading to Ireland, where she exchanged sexual favors for silence among the soldiers who found her on board. A nice customs agent, Jack Kelly (Byrne), allowed Bernadette to enter Ireland illegally, and they soon became a couple, even though she was already pregnant from one of the soldiers from the ship.

Bernadette gave birth to Frankie (Alan Pentony), who suffered from dwarfism. As he grew older, Frankie developed romantic feelings for Jack's daughter Emma (Georgina Cates), who did not share his feelings, while Jack taught astronomy to Frankie. Eventually, Bernadette met Terry Klout (Dillon), an American soldier she had met on the war ship, who offered to marry her. Bernadette and Frankie went with Terry to his home in Texas, but both mother and son felt they didn't belong, so they returned to the Irish home they loved. An older Bernadette eventually committed suicide, and Frank then used his life as source material for his writing.

Principal cast
 Gabriel Byrne as Jack Kelly
 Anne Parillaud as Bernadette
 Matt Dillon as Terry Klout 
 Corban Walker as Frank Bois
 Rudi Davies as Emma
Georgina Cates as Young Emma
 Dearbhla Molloy as Effa Kelly

Critical reception
Janet Maslin of The New York Times thought the film was flawed but decent and did not think highly of Parillaud's acting:

References

External links

1995 films
Films scored by Elmer Bernstein
Films based on American novels
Films set in the 1940s
Films set in Ireland
Films set in Texas
Films shot in London
Films shot in the Republic of Ireland
Films shot in Texas
Films directed by Michael Lindsay-Hogg
Films about mother–son relationships
1990s English-language films